Allan B. Ritter is an American politician and a former member of the Texas House of Representatives. He was first elected to the Texas House of Representatives in 1998 as a Democrat. He switched political parties and became a Republican in 2010.

In October 2013, Ritter stated that he would retire from the state legislature at the conclusion of his eighth term. Ritter was credited with the proposal and subsequent passage of House Bill 4 in 2014, regarding the water supply in Texas, an issue first considered by the state legislature in 1999.

References

Living people
Year of birth missing (living people)
People from Nederland, Texas
Texas Republicans
Texas Democrats
20th-century American politicians
21st-century American politicians
Members of the Texas House of Representatives